Man. Feel. Pain. is a Canadian short drama film, directed by Dylan Akio Smith and released in 2004. The film stars Brad Dryborough as Karl, an isolated loner who deliberately nails his hand to a wall as an experiment in self-inflicted pain, only to become venerated by his neighbours as a Christ-like figure as they learn of his suffering. Smith described the film as "about people being drawn to false idols".

The film's cast also includes Ryan Robbins, Peter New and Arabella Bushnell.

The film was produced for and premiered at the 2004 Crazy8s festival in Vancouver. It was later screened at the 2004 Toronto International Film Festival, where it won the award for Best Canadian Short Film, and at the Whistler Film Festival, where it was cowinner with Becky Bristow's film A Russian Wave of the ShortWork Award.

References

External links
 

2004 films
2004 short films
Films shot in British Columbia
2000s English-language films
Films directed by Dylan Akio Smith
Canadian drama short films
2000s Canadian films